Shortkut (also known as Short Kut: The Con Is On) is a 2009 Indian Hindi-language comedy film directed by Neeraj Vora and produced by Anil Kapoor under Anil Kapoor Films Company. The film stars Akshaye Khanna, Arshad Warsi and Amrita Rao in lead roles. It released on 10 July 2009 worldwide to mostly negative reviews from critics.

The film was an uncredited remake of the Malayalam-language film Udayananu Tharam starring Mohanlal.

Plot
The story focuses on Shekhar (Akshaye Khanna), who is currently an assistant director, hoping to write and direct his own movies soon. His friend Raju (Arshad Warsi) is a struggling actor who has been waiting on Shekhar to write a film script so he can star in his movie. However, when Shekhar rejects him as the film's leading role, Raju decides to steal Shekhar's film script, star in the movie himself and release it without crediting Shekhar. The film is released and it turns out to be a blockbuster, propelling Raju to overnight stardom. Heartbroken Shekhar, now experiences a break-up with his girlfriend Mansi (Amrita Rao). Nonetheless, Shekhar writes a new and better film script and wants to star Raju in it, however when Raju rejects the script, Shekhar decides to film the movie without Raju ever knowing that he is in it. Shekhar and his low-budget film crew follow Raju around everywhere to complete their movie covertly. Eventually, when the movie is released, Raju's role in the film attracts embarrassment and humiliation but the film itself succeeds and Shekhar finally enjoys a taste of success in the film industry. In the end, an unfazed Raju decides not to change his ways but to again steal someone else's script.

Cast 
 Arshad Warsi as Rajesh "Raju" (King Kumar)
 Akshaye Khanna as Shekhar Giriraj 
 Amrita Rao as Mansi
 Chunky Pandey as Guru Kapoor
 Tiku Talsania as Tolani
 Siddharth Randeria as Kantibhai
 Ali Asghar as Vikram “Vicky”, Mansi's brother 
 Anil Kapoor as himself
 Sanjay Dutt as himself

Soundtrack

The film's soundtrack is composed by Shankar Mahadevan, Ehsaan Noorani and Loy Mendonsa, with lyrics penned by Javed Akhtar. The song, "Patli Galli" was split into two versions in the film, even though only one version was included in the soundtrack.

Track list
The soundtrack contains four original songs and three remixes.

Reception
Short Kut was panned by film critics in India and considered a major disappointment.

References

External links
 

2000s Hindi-language films
2009 comedy films
2009 films
Viacom18 Studios films
Hindi remakes of Malayalam films
Indian comedy films
Films about Bollywood
Films directed by Neeraj Vora
Hindi-language comedy films